KPE or Kpe may refer to:

 Kallang–Paya Lebar Expressway. a highway in Singapore
 Kpe (Bakweri), an ethnic group of Cameroon
 Katholische Pfadfinderschaft Europas (Catholic Scouts of Europe), Scout Associations in Germany and Austria
 Konami Parlor Entertainment Inc., former Pachinko and Pachi equipment division of Konami Group